Mykyrokka is a soup that is a typical traditional dish in eastern Finland (Savo region). The main ingredient is myky: a palm sized dumpling made from blood and barley flour. The dumplings are cooked in the soup. The soup also contains potatoes, onions, fatty meat, and offal such as kidneys, liver and or heart. Salt and black pepper are the usual seasonings.

This soup is also called tappaiskeitto (i.e., "butchery soup") referring to an old farm custom of autumn butchery when some animals were butchered and the meat and organs were made into sausages, hams, and other meats, and what remained was put into the soup.

Soup is also considered the traditional parish dish of the Heinola town in the 1980s.

See also
 Kesäkeitto

References

Finnish cuisine
Blood soups
Meat dishes